Ricardo "Kiki" Lara (born July 24, 1981, in Las Cruces, New Mexico) is an American former soccer player who last played for the USL First Division side Portland Timbers and currently works as head coach of the Incarnate Word Cardinals.

Career 
Lara played college soccer in San Antonio, Texas at the University of the Incarnate Word. He captained the team from 2001 to 2003 and was also named a Division II All-American in each of those 3 seasons. In 2004, he joined the Minnesota Thunder and played 26 games in his inaugural season. He then played 19 times and scored one goal the following campaign.

Coaching career 
He started his coaching career in 1995 as coach of the Las Cruces Strikers, a youth soccer club founded by his mother Linda Lara.

In 2005 while still a player with the Minnesota Thunder, he also worked as an assistant coach of the Washington State University women's soccer program.

On June 8, 2009, he was named as an assistant coach for the Dayton Flyers men's soccer team.

He was named the head coach of the Eastern Illinois Panthers men's soccer team on March 10, 2015. Lara was the Eastern Illinois women's soccer head coach for the 2016 and 2017 seasons.

References

External links
Kiki Lara profile at Player History

1981 births
Living people
Association football midfielders
Minnesota Thunder players
Sportspeople from Las Cruces, New Mexico
Portland Timbers (2001–2010) players
Soccer players from New Mexico
American soccer coaches
American sportspeople of Mexican descent
A-League (1995–2004) players
USL First Division players
Eastern Illinois Panthers men's soccer coaches
Incarnate Word Cardinals men's soccer players
Dayton Flyers men's soccer coaches
American soccer players
Incarnate Word Cardinals men's soccer coaches
Washington State Cougars women's soccer coaches
Eastern Illinois Panthers women's soccer coaches